Vincenzo Capobianchi or Capobianchi (1836 – 28 September 1928) was an Italian painter born in Rome, who is best known for painting realistic Neo-Pompeian genre scenes. He was also a prominent numismatist, and author of papers on Italian coinage.

Among his works are: The Yellow Dress (1875), Roman children practice indoor archery (1881), and The Merchant of Fine Antiquities

References

1836 births
1928 deaths
Painters from Rome
19th-century Italian painters
Italian male painters
20th-century Italian painters
20th-century Italian male artists
Neo-Pompeian painters
Italian numismatists
19th-century Italian male artists